Dini Dimakos is a Canadian stand-up comedian and registered social worker.

Early life
Dimakos was raised in the rural town of Shelburne, Ontario, an hour north of Toronto. Her family ran a restaurant in the nearby town of Primrose, Ontario. She began working at the restaurant as a seating hostess, dishwasher and garlic bread cook at the age of 6, during the 1980s. Her family later sold the restaurant to relatives and opened another restaurant down the street in 1991.

Dimakos later attended Centre Dufferin District High School and starred in productions of Guys and Dolls and Bye, Bye Birdie. She graduated with honours and continued on with a partial scholarship to York University.

Performing career

Radio
In the late 1990s Dimakos began interning at a Brampton, Ontario radio station called Hot 103.5 FM, which would later be known as Hits 103.5 FM, and currently Z 103.5 (CIDC), (Evanov Group LTD). The station specialized in dance music and Top 40 hits. Within a month of interning, Dimakos was hired on as a Promotions Assistant. While at a concert, Dini performed an impromptu live on-air cut in. This led to weekend stints as an on-air personality, broadcasting live on location. Eventually she was filling in on the morning show as a co-host while radio personality Elvira Caria was on maternity leave. Her experience as a morning show co-host was further enhanced by working along with the host of the show Darrin "Big D" Laidman.

Television production
After her time in radio, Dimakos began to take interest in television broadcasting. She volunteered her time at 2001 Canadian Comedy Awards, which led to a chance meeting with television personality and comedian Mista Mo, who co-starred in the television show Buzz and on The Comedy Network. Having a keen interest in Canadian television and how a comedy show was produced, Dimakos was soon hired as a Production Assistant on Buzz by MTR Entertainment. She worked on the show from seasons 3 to 6. She was later promoted to the Senior Production Coordinator on seasons 5 and 6.

Improvisation and stand-up beginnings
During this time, Dimakos was attending improv classes at The Second City in Toronto and began writing stand-up material. She partook in a week long stand-up comedy workshop at Humber College in 2003 under the guidance of veteran comedians Larry Horowitz and Mike MacDonald. This was a life-altering time for Dini as she found a love for writing and performing stand-up comedy. She quickly signed up for amateur nights at the Yuk Yuk's Comedy Club in Toronto, Ontario. She also began performing on the open mike circuit in the Toronto area.

MuchMusic Video on Trial
Dimakos may be best known for her work, from 2006 to 2013, on MuchMusic. She was a series regular for network's hit show, Video on Trial, featuring on over 20 episodes along with the likes of Canadian comedians Russell Peters, Debra DiGiovanni and Trevor Boris.

MuchMusic Stars Gone Wild
MuchMusic launched a new show in September 2007, Stars Gone Wild. The show blasted current celebrities by a menagerie of colorful characters. Dini appeared on several episodes respectively as Posy Perennial, Matthew the Emo Girl, Dr. Pat McGroin, Belinda Belissima, Chandelier W. Bush (girlfriend of Boomer Phillips' character Lance Sherbourne), Rhonda the Housewife and most popularly as the daring nun, Sister Siobhan O'Shepardspie. The series was one of the highest rated shows on the network.

Much on Demand
In October 2007, Dini was interviewed live on Much on Demand by VJs Leah Miller and Matte Babel. She was asked about her career in stand-up comedy as well as her character work on Stars Gone Wild. Dini noted her earliest influences as Mike Myers, Adam Sandler and Eddie Murphy.

Stand-up
In February 2007, Dini was chosen as the opening act for veteran comedian Angelo Tsarouchas on the It's All Greek To Me Tour in Melbourne and Sydney, Australia. The tour was spearheaded by Clayton Peters of Clayton Peters International Management. Clayton Peters is most widely known in the industry as manager and brother to Russell Peters.

Later that year Dini performed in Las Vegas at a local club. She then went to London, England, in July 2007 to perform at Jongleurs, a popular London Comedy chain. Dini was well received by international audiences and continued to earn attention on an international level thanks to her live performances and material on YouTube.

In the summer of 2007, she was the first comedian ever to perform live on the Toronto show Bitch Salad. Bitch Salad is helmed by fellow Canadian comedian Andrew Johnston. He hosts a popular blog of the same name.

That same year, Dimakos performed on the annual Accent on Toronto (6) - The Laughs Are On Us alongside Jean Paul and Frank Spadone. Accent on Toronto is nationally aired on CBC Radio One, 99.1 FM.

Film
In October 2007, Dimakos won the role of Grace on the short film Speed Dating. Grace is a jilted, closeted lesbian who is secretly in love with her best girlfriend.

Later career
, Dimakos' personal LinkedIn page shows that, following a career in entertainment from 1998 (as a fill-in radio host) to 2019, followed by schooling and training from 2019 to 2021, she is now Dini Dimakos Shevchenko, and is a Registered Social Service Worker (RSSW) with the Hills of Headwaters Collaborative Ontario Health Team, specifically part of the team located in Caledon, Ontario, providing support and caregiving to healthcare workers and their families throughout Dufferin County.

Press
In November 2007 Dimakos was featured in the Toronto Star twice in the same day. An article by Michele Henry focused on Dini's life as a Toronto comedian including where she performs, shops and resides in the city. The second feature was a humorous quip by the young comedian on the commercialism of Toronto and was used to promote CBC Radio One's production of Accent on Toronto 6 - The Laughs Are On Us.

References

External links

Dini Dimakos at Accent on Toronto 2007 Standup routine via CBC.ca  

Canadian women comedians
Canadian people of Greek descent
Comedians from Toronto
Living people
People from Dufferin County
Seneca College alumni
York University alumni
Year of birth missing (living people)